Dudley Tower, also known as First Wausau Tower, is a high-rise building located in downtown Wausau, Wisconsin. Sitting on the shore of the Wisconsin River, it is the prominent building in the Wausau city skyline. First Wausau Tower is the tallest commercial building in Wisconsin outside of Milwaukee.

Currently, First Wausau Tower is occupied by Ruder Ware, WoodTrust,  CGI, and Miron Construction. Architect, Performa, Inc, designed the building to be a "state-of-the-art office building features amenities that go beyond building codes, including security systems with proximity card readers; wireless, cable, or satellite communications infrastructure, an advanced heating and cooling system, and a lower level, climate-controlled executive parking facility." Dudley Tower's offices can hold, in total, about 500 employees. The building is also host to WAOW-TV's Dudley Tower Skycam.

The building has won two awards: The Daily Reporter - Top Projects in Wisconsin - 2007 and the WRMCA Concrete Design Award - 2007.

Dudley Tower's builder, Miron Construction, created a time-lapse video showing its construction phase during 2006 & 2007.

References

Wausau, Wisconsin
Towers in Wisconsin
Skyscraper office buildings in Wisconsin
Skyscrapers in Wisconsin